MoKenStef is an American female R&B trio from Los Angeles, California,  active from 1994 until 2000. The group name was a combination of the first syllable of each member's name: Monifa, Kenya, and Stefanie. They released an album, Azz Izz, in 1995, and their biggest hit was "He's Mine", which peaked at #7 on the Billboard Hot 100. It also spent one week in the UK Singles Chart in September 1995 at #70. Their second single, "Sex in the Rain", was not as successful, peaking only at #41 on the US R&B chart.

The last single was intended to be "Baby Come Close", remake of Smokey Robinson's song, for which MoKenStef recorded a remix called "I Can't Help It" (this one was a cover of Michael Jackson's song). Both, album and remix versions were released promotionally on cd and vinyl, the group also made a video for it directed by Cameron Casey, but in the end the intended single was never released commercially.

In 1995 the group performed "He's Mine" on the television shows Soul Train, All That and Video Soul.

After Azz Izz
MoKenStef appeared on the soundtrack of the film, Phat Beach in 1996, with the song "Jock'n Me". In 1999, the group released a single called "He Say She Say", which was a promotion for the album Hits 4 the New Millennium by Cool Dre, but their attempt was unsuccessful. In 2000, they officially disbanded. In 2014 MoKenStef reunited and their Instagram page can be found, as Therealmokenstef.

Discography

Album
 Azz Izz (1995)

Singles
 "He's Mine" (1995)
 "Sex In the Rain" (1995)
 "Baby Come Close" (1995) (promotional only)
 "He Say She Say" (1999)  (promotional only)

References

Musical groups established in 1994
Musical groups disestablished in 2000
Musical groups reestablished in 2014
American contemporary R&B musical groups
African-American musical groups
African-American girl groups